The 1935–36 Allsvenskan was the second season of the top division of Swedish handball. Six teams competed in the league. Redbergslids IK won the league, but the title of Swedish Champions was awarded to the winner of Svenska mästerskapet. IFK Örebro and Karlskrona BK were relegated.

League table

Attendance

References 

Swedish handball competitions